The Beal-Burrow Dry Goods Building is a historic commercial building at 107 East Markham Street in Little Rock, Arkansas.  It is a seven-story concrete frame structure, finished in brick.  Its main entrance is recessed at the center of its main facade, richly decorated in stone.  The roof cornice is pressed metal, and paneled medallions punctuate the banding between the first and second floors.  The building was probably designed by Arkansas architect Charles L. Thompson, for the Beal-Burrow Company, a wholesaler of dry goods.

The building was listed on the National Register of Historic Places in 1995.

See also
National Register of Historic Places listings in Little Rock, Arkansas

References

Commercial buildings on the National Register of Historic Places in Arkansas
Prairie School architecture
Buildings and structures completed in 1920
Buildings and structures in Little Rock, Arkansas
National Register of Historic Places in Little Rock, Arkansas